Polkton is a town in Anson County, North Carolina,  United States. As of the 2020 census, the town population was 1,881 down from 3,375 in 2010.

The town is named after its founder, Leonidas L. Polk.

History
Polkton was founded by Leonidas Lafayette Polk, and incorporated in 1875. The Billy Horne Farm was listed on the National Register of Historic Places in 1989.

Geography
Polkton is located at  (35.003888, -80.201527).

Demographics

2020 census

As of the 2020 United States census, there were 2,250 people, 550 households, and 363 families residing in the town.

2000 census
As of the census of 2000, there were 1,195 people, 297 households, and 206 families residing in the town. The population density was 438.5 people per square mile (169.0/km). There were 336 housing units at an average density of 123.3/sq mi (47.5/km). The racial makeup of the town was 56.32% African American, 40.08% White, 1.34% Asian, 1.26% Native American, 0% Pacific Islander, 0.59% from other races, and 0.42% from two or more races. Hispanic or Latino of any race were 1.17% of the population.

There were 297 households, out of which 28.6% had children under the age of 18 living with them, 42.4% were married couples living together, 20.9% had a female householder with no husband present, and 30.6% were non-families. 27.6% of all households were made up of individuals, and 9.1% had someone living alone who was 65 years of age or older. The average household size was 2.66 and the average family size was 3.25.

In the town, the population was spread out, with 18.7% under the age of 18, 10.4% from 18 to 24, 42.5% from 25 to 44, 19.9% from 45 to 64, and 8.5% who were 65 years of age or older. The median age was 34 years. For every 100 females, there were 185.2 males. For every 100 females age 18 and over, there were 217.3 males.

The median income for a household in the town was $30,329, and the median income for a family was $35,313. Males had a median income of $23,125 versus $20,682 for females. The per capita income for the town was $13,783. About 16.3% of families and 22.5% of the population were below the poverty line, including 31.5% of those under age 18 and 22.9% of those age 65 or over.

Education
The main campus of South Piedmont Community College is on US Highway 74 at the edge of Polkton.  SPCC serves Anson and Union counties.

References

External links
 Town of Polkton official website

Towns in Anson County, North Carolina
Towns in North Carolina
Populated places established in 1875
1875 establishments in North Carolina